Strahinja Milić (born 22 December 1990) is a Serbian handball player who plays for RK Partizan.

Club career
Born in Pristina, Milić moved with his family to Belgrade in 1999. He soon joined the youth system of Partizan. In December 2006, it was reported that Milić signed a pre-contract with THW Kiel, which was made effective after his 16th birthday. He was immediately assigned to Bjerringbro-Silkeborg.

In August 2009, Milić returned to his parent club Partizan. He helped them win the national championship in the 2010–11 season. In February 2012, Milić moved to Macedonian side Vardar. He was a member of the team that won the 2016–17 EHF Champions League. After the 2017–18 season, Milić was released by the club due to continuing problems with his weight.

International career
In April 2007, at age 16, Milić became the youngest player ever to make senior debut for Serbia. He later participated in the 2014 European Men's Handball Championship.

Honours
Partizan
 Handball League of Serbia: 2010–11
Vardar
 Macedonian Handball Super League: 2012–13, 2014–15, 2015–16, 2016–17, 2017–18
 Macedonian Handball Cup: 2013–14, 2014–15, 2015–16, 2016–17, 2017–18
 EHF Champions League: 2016–17
 SEHA League: 2011–12, 2013–14, 2016–17, 2017–18

References

External links
 EHF record

1990 births
Living people
Sportspeople from Pristina
Kosovo Serbs
Serbian male handball players
RK Partizan players
RK Vardar players
Expatriate handball players
Serbian expatriate sportspeople in Denmark
Serbian expatriate sportspeople in North Macedonia